Reñihúe Airport is an airport serving the hamlet of Reñihúe,  north-northeast of Chaitén, a city in the Los Lagos Region of Chile. Reñihué is at the eastern end of Reñihué Fjord, which opens into the Gulf of Ancud.

There is mountainous terrain in all quadrants except approaches to the airport along the fjord or along the Reñihué River valley.

See also

Transport in Chile
List of airports in Chile

References

External links
OpenStreetMap - Reñihúe
OurAirports - Reñihúe
FallingRain - Reñihúe Airport

Airports in Los Lagos Region